William Leslie (May 27, 1925 – December 19, 2005) was an American film and television actor.

Born in Seagraves, Texas. Leslie attended at University of Colorado. He served in the United States Navy during World War II for which Leslie served for three years. He began his career in 1952, where Leslie co-starred in the film Scorching Fury alongside actors, Richard Devon and Sherwood Price. He then appeared in the 1953 film Forever Female. 

Leslie appeared in two films from 1955 with actress, Lucy Marlow. He guest-starred in television programs including Fury, Tales of Wells Fargo, The Donna Reed Show, My Three Sons, Dr. Kildare, Ironside, The Adventures of Rin Tin Tin, Hawaiian Eye, Combat! and Father Knows Best. Leslie also co-starred and appeared in films such as, Up Periscope, Bring Your Smile Along, Hellcats of the Navy, The Horse Soldiers, The Night the World Exploded, Operation Mad Ball, Mutiny in Outer Space, The Long Gray Line, The White Squaw, The Couch, The Lineup, Return to Warbow and Magnificent Obsession.

Leslie died in December 2005 in Apple Valley, California, at the age of 80.

References

External links 

Rotten Tomatoes profile

1925 births
2005 deaths
People from Texas
Male actors from Texas
American male film actors
American male television actors
20th-century American male actors
University of Colorado alumni